Vlasikha is a rural locality (a selo) in Barnaul, Altai Krai, Russia. The population was 2,992 as of 2013. There are 90 streets.

Geography 
Vlasikha is located 18 km southwest of Barnaul by road. Oktyabrsky is the nearest rural locality.

References 

Rural localities in Barnaul urban okrug